The Resorts World Manila Masters was a golf tournament on the Asian Tour. It was played for the first time in November 2013 at the Manila Southwoods Golf and Country Club in Manila, Philippines. In 2017, the event became the flagship event of the Asian Tour, with a minimum twenty Official World Golf Ranking points to the winner, compared to 14 for most Asian Tour events.

Winners

External links
Coverage on the Asian Tour's official site

Former Asian Tour events
Golf tournaments in the Philippines
Sports in Metro Manila
Recurring sporting events established in 2013
2013 establishments in the Philippines